Baron Béla Tallián de Vizek (1851 – 23 November 1921) was a Hungarian politician, who served as Minister of Agriculture between 1903 and 1905. He was one of the deputy speakers of the House of Representatives from 1899 to 1903. During the First World War he served as civil governor of Belgrade for a short time after the occupation of the Serbian capital city. After the war he escaped to Szeged. He was arrested by the communists during the Hungarian Soviet Republic. After the fall of the communist regime he moved to Szeged.

References
 Magyar Életrajzi Lexikon	

1851 births
1921 deaths
People from Somogy County
Agriculture ministers of Hungary
Austro-Hungarian people of World War I
Lord-lieutenants of a county in Hungarian Kingdom